Varden Church is a parish church of the Church of Norway in Stavanger Municipality in Rogaland county, Norway. It is located in the Varden in the borough of Storhaug in the city of Stavanger. It is the church for the Varden parish which is part of the Stavanger domprosti (arch-deanery) in the Diocese of Stavanger. The red brick church was built in a rectangular design in 1967 using designs by the architects Jan Jæger and Per Faltinsen. The church seats about 430 people.

See also
List of churches in Rogaland

References

Churches in Stavanger
Brick churches in Norway
20th-century Church of Norway church buildings
Churches completed in 1967
1967 establishments in Norway